"Snooker Loopy" is a humorous song which was released as a single in May 1986, and entered the UK Singles Chart, reaching #6. It was written and performed by Chas & Dave and featured snooker players Steve Davis, Dennis Taylor, Willie Thorne, Terry Griffiths and Tony Meo, as backing vocalists under the name 'The Matchroom Mob' – Matchroom Sport being the company owned by promoter Barry Hearn which employed all these snooker professionals at the time.

The lyric is a mild satire on the style and antics of the players involved: "old Willie Thorne, his hair's all gawn", for example. The verse on Steve Davis also makes light of the 1985 World Snooker Championship final and his missed black in the final frame, and notes his manager is not concerned who should win the upcoming 1986 Championship, "because he's got the rest of us signed up!" Somewhat ironically, the player who won the 1986 World Snooker Championship - Joe Johnson - was not involved, seeing as he was a 150-1 outsider before the tournament.

Upon reaching the top 10, the players joined Chas & Dave and performed the song on Top of the Pops

Chas & Dave performed the song at their live shows with the original lyrics during the subsequent part of their career, even after all the players mentioned had retired from the professional game; this included a performance at Glastonbury Festival in 2007. The song was mentioned to Ronnie O'Sullivan during an episode of A League of Their Own in 2012, leading to Freddie Flintoff singing the chorus, with the audience joining in at the end.

A rival single was released in the same year by snooker players Tony Knowles, Alex Higgins, Kirk Stevens and Jimmy White; it was a cover of "The Wanderer", released under the name Four Away.

"The Romford Rap"

A follow-up snooker song, The Romford Rap, was released in 1987. This time, 'The Matchroom Mob' was made up of Steve Davis, Willie Thorne, Jimmy White, Neal Foulds, Dennis Taylor, Tony Meo and Terry Griffiths. It was far less successful, only reaching #91 in the UK charts.

See also 
 Chas & Dave discography

References

Songs about sportspeople
1986 singles
Snooker mass media
Novelty songs
Sporting songs
Chas & Dave songs